Aluabari Road Junction railway station is a junction railway station on Katihar–Siliguri branch of Howrah–New Jalpaiguri line in the Katihar railway division of Northeast Frontier Railway zone. It is situated beside National Highway 31 at Islampur of Uttar Dinajpur district in the Indian state of West Bengal. This railway station connects the Alubari–Siliguri branch line and New Farakka–New Jalpaiguri line. Total 35 express and passenger trains stop at Aluabari Road Junction railway station in a day.

Trains
Following trains are available from this station:
Sealdah-Alipurduar Kanchan Kanya Express
Dibrugarh-Lalgarh Avadh Assam Express
Sealdah–Agartala Kanchenjunga Express
Delhi-Alipurduar Mahananda Express
Balurghat–Siliguri Intercity Express
 Katihar–Siliguri Intercity Express
Sealdah–Silchar Kanchenjunga Express
Dibrugarh-Howrah Kamrup Express
Sealdah-New Alipurdiar Teesta Torsha Express
Sealdah-Bamanhat Uttar Banga Express

References

Railway stations in Uttar Dinajpur district
Katihar railway division
Railway junction stations in West Bengal